Elise Schmit (born 1982) is a Luxembourg writer and literary critic who writes mainly in German. She has won many awards including the 2019 Prix Servais for Stürze aus unterschiedlichen Fallhöhen, a collection of short stories, which was judged to be the most significant literary work published in Luxembourg in 2018.

Biography
Born in Luxembourg on 4 February 1982, she studied German philology and philosophy at the University of Tübingen.

Schmit has received many awards in Luxembourg, including the first prize for the Concours littéraire national in 2010 and 2012, as well as third prize in 2017; and the Prix Servais in 2019.

References

1982 births
Living people
Luxembourgian short story writers
21st-century Luxembourgian writers
21st-century Luxembourgian women writers